The Best of Walt Disney's True-Life Adventures is a 1975 American compilation documentary film produced by Walt Disney Productions, directed by James Algar and released by Buena Vista Distribution on October 8, 1975. The film is composed of highlights from the Academy Award winning True-Life Adventures series of 13 feature length and short subject nature documentary films produced between 1948 and 1960.

Synopsis
The film opens with a salute to Walt Disney, a pioneer of nature films and animal lover, followed by a compilation of excerpted segments from the True-Life Adventures film series showcasing animals of all kinds depicted in dramatic, fascinating moments of habitats from the American prairie to the North American desert, to Africa, the Amazon jungle and to the Arctic.

Featured documentary films
Seal Island (1948)
In Beaver Valley (1950)
Nature's Half Acre (1951)
The Olympic Elk (1952)
Water Birds (1952)
Bear Country (1953)
Prowlers of the Everglades (1953)
The Living Desert (1953)
The Vanishing Prairie (1954)
The African Lion (1955)
Secrets of Life (1956)
White Wilderness (1958)
Jungle Cat (1960)

Home media
The Best of Walt Disney's True-Life Adventures was released only on VHS in the United Kingdom in the 1980s. To date, it has never been released on any physical format in the United States by Walt Disney Studios Home Entertainment. The film is available as a digital download on Amazon Video, YouTube, Disney Movies Anywhere and iTunes.

See also
 List of American films of 1975
True-Life Adventures
List of Disney live-action shorts
List of Walt Disney Pictures films

References

External links
  

1975 documentary films
1975 films
Compilation films
Walt Disney Pictures films
Disney documentary films
Documentary films about nature
Films about animals
Films directed by James Algar
Films produced by James Algar
Films produced by Ben Sharpsteen
Films scored by Buddy Baker (composer)
Films scored by Oliver Wallace
Films scored by Paul Smith (film and television composer)
Films with screenplays by Winston Hibler
1970s English-language films
1970s American films